Clinker Gulch is a gulch extending from Lucifer Hill to the north shore of Candlemas Island, South Sandwich Islands. The name applied by the UK Antarctic Place-Names Committee in 1971 reflects the actively volcanic, sulphurous nature of the area, and the loose piles of lava debris, resembling furnace clinkers, which wall the gulch.

References

 

Valleys of Antarctica
Landforms of South Georgia and the South Sandwich Islands